Deraeocoris nubilus is a species of plant bug in the family Miridae. It is found in North America.

Subspecies
These two subspecies belong to the species Deraeocoris nubilus.
 Deraeocoris nubilus nubilus Knight, 1921
 Deraeocoris nubilus obscuripes Knight, 1921

References

Further reading

 
 
 
 
 
 
 
 

Insects described in 1921
Deraeocorini